"Warum" is a song by German band Juli. It was written by band members Simon Triebel and Eva Briegel and produced by O.L.A.F. Opal for their debut album Es ist Juli (2004). The song was the fourth single release from the album.

Formats and track listings

Charts

References

2005 singles
Juli (band) songs
2005 songs
Songs written by Eva Briegel
Songs written by Simon Triebel
German-language songs